In the mathematical subject of topology, an ambient isotopy, also called an h-isotopy, is a kind of continuous distortion of an ambient space, for example a manifold, taking a submanifold to another submanifold. For example in knot theory, one considers two knots the same if one can distort one knot into the other without breaking it. Such a distortion is an example of an ambient isotopy. A continuous map 
 
This implies that the orientation must be preserved by ambient isotopies. For example, two knots that are mirror images of each other are, in general, not equivalent.

See also
Isotopy
Regular homotopy
Regular isotopy

References 
M. A. Armstrong, Basic Topology, Springer-Verlag, 1983
Sasho Kalajdzievski, An Illustrated Introduction to Topology and Homotopy, CRC Press, 2010, Chapter 10: Isotopy and Homotopy
Topology
Maps of manifolds